The 1912–13 Colgate Raiders men's basketball team represented Colgate University during the 1912–13 college men's basketball season. The head coach was Ellery Huntington Sr. coaching the Raiders in his 13th season. The team finished with a final record of 7–7. The team captain was Walt Hammond.

Schedule

|-

References

Colgate Raiders men's basketball seasons
Colgate
Colgate
Colgate